Euan is a Scottish, male given name, most common throughout the United Kingdom, Canada and Australia, due to the influence of Scots in both nations. It is also, less commonly, a surname.

The name Euan comes from Greek and Hebrew:  (the New Testament in Greek has St. John's Gospel as ) which in turn comes from the Hebrew , 'God is gracious'. The English equivalent of the name is "John", but the Scottish "Euan" is very close in sound to the original Greek. 

Owain is the predominant Welsh spelling of the name (or Owen when Anglicized), but Iwan and Iuan are also found, as they are in Cornish. Ouen can be considered the French or Breton spelling of the name.

Euan is also a Latin word meaning Bacchus.

People with the given name

In the arts and media
Euan Heng (born 1945), Scottish painter
Euan Kerr, editor of The Beano
Euan Lloyd (1923–2016), British film producer
Euan Macleod (born 1956), New Zealand painter
Euan Morton (born 1977), Scottish singer and actor
Euan Uglow (1932–2000), English painter

In sports
Euan Aitken (born 1995), Australian rugby league footballer
Euan Burton (born 1979), British judoka
Euan Byers (born 1974), Scottish curler
Euan Dale (born 1985), Scottish swimmer
Euan Henderson (snooker player) (born 1967), Scottish snooker player
Euan McLean (born 1986), Scottish footballer
Euan Norris (born 1977), Scottish football referee
Euan Murray (born 1980), Scottish rugby union footballer

In politics
Euan Geddes, 3rd Baron Geddes (born 1937), peer and politician
Euan Howard, 4th Baron Strathcona and Mount Royal (1923–2018), British politician
Euan McLeod, member of the Scottish Labour Party
Euan Robson (born 1954), Scottish Liberal Democrats politician
Euan Wallace (1892–1941), British Conservative politician

In other fields
Euan Mason, New Zealand forestry academic
Euan Sutherland, Scottish businessman

Characters
Euan Abercrombie, minor character from the Harry Potter series by J. K. Rowling
Euan Pierce, the lead character from the TV series Off Centre

See also
Eógan
Eógan (given name)
Iwan (name)
Evan
Ewan
MacEwen

References

Scottish masculine given names